Tully House may refer to:
William Tully House, Old Saybrook, Connecticut, USA
Tullie House Museum and Art Gallery Trust, Carlisle, England